Marion is a city in and the county seat of Marion County, South Carolina, United States. It is named for Francis Marion, a brigadier general from South Carolina in the American Revolutionary War. The population was 6,939 at the 2010 census.

History
The Marion High School, Marion County Court House, Marion County Library, Marion County Museum and Marion Historic District are listed on the National Register of Historic Places.

Some sixty years after the first permanent settlement in South Carolina, a group of English settlers sent out by the Lords Proprietor landed in Georgetown and moved up the Pee Dee River to the junction of the Little Pee Dee River about halfway between Georgetown and the present town of Marion. Among these families were Brittons, Davis, Flaglers, Giles, Graves and Tyler. At about the same time, and maybe on the same ship from England, came Captain John Godbold, a retired English sea captain. He moved farther up the Big Pee Dee and settled on Catfish Creek. The creek is southwest of and very near to the present city limits of Marion.

During its early colonial years the area was part of Craven County. When Craven was divided, this segment of land was placed in Georgetown District and was known as Gilesboro after Col. Hugh Giles, American Revolutionary war hero who fought under Francis Marion. In 1785, another division was made and the name "Liberty" was used for a short time to designate this area.

On December 17, 1847, when by an act of the South Carolina Legislature a charter was issued to the town, its official name was given as "Marion". The name honors General Francis Marion, a hero of the Revolutionary War.

Court House
A commission was appointed by the South Carolina Legislature to locate the site for a court house. Court was scheduled for the first Monday in March 1800. The court house was not complete, so it was held in a log building on Colonel Hugh Giles' plantation about two miles below Marion. The section was called Gilesboro or Gilesboro Court House for some time after. The Commissioners appointed to select the site for the Court House were offered land by several land owners in the vicinity, including Giles, but they chose and accepted four acres from Thomas Godbold, a grandson of Captain John Godbold. The present Court House was erected in 1854 and is the third Court House on or near the same site.

During the Revolutionary War, the people of Marion County were divided in their loyalties. There were ardent Patriots under Col. Hugh Giles, Capt. John Dozier, Capt. Stephen Godbold and others. Maj. Micajah Ganey and Capt. Jessee Barfield led the Loyalists. Before the end of the war, most of the Loyalists had pledged allegiance to the colonists due to the activities of General Francis Marion in the area. The Revolutionary battles in the county were Port's Ferry, Blue Savannah and Bowling Green.

During the American Civil War, Marion County was spared damage from Sherman's troops due to the Big Pee Dee River being at flood stage. The troops were unable to cross the river. The county fully participated in the reconstruction and in 1876 there were Red Shirt organizations in every township.

Marion mascot is Swamp foxes.

Railroad
Marion County had several periods of growth. With the building and completion of the Wilmington to Manchester Railroad in 1854, business and transportation improved. Gen. W.W. Harllee was the first president of the railroad; the town of Florence, to the west of Marion, was named for his daughter. The second president was Col. William S. Mullins for whom the town of Mullins was named.  Col. William S. Mullins-	birth- 1824 Fayetteville, Cumberland County, North Carolina.
DEATH	1878 (aged 53–54)
Mullins, Marion County, South Carolina, USA
BURIAL	
Mullins Cemetery
Mullins, Marion County, South Carolina, USA

Separation
In 1888, a part of the west side of the county was separated to form Florence County and in 1910 the upper part of the county was separated to form Dillon County.

Geography
Marion is located at  (34.180088, -79.397098).

Demographics

2020 census

As of the 2020 United States census, there were 6,448 people, 2,345 households, and 1,568 families residing in the city.

2000 census
At the 2000 census, there were 7,042 people, 2,765 households and 1,913 families residing in the city. The population density was 1,627.5 per square mile (627.9/km2). There were 3,081 housing units at an average density of 712.0 per square mile (274.7/km2). The racial makeup of the city was 66.22% African American, 32.14% White,  0.14% Native American, 0.40% Asian, 0.40% from other races, and 0.71% from two or more races. Hispanic or Latino of any race were 1.02% of the population.

There were 2,765 households, of which 31.5% had children under the age of 18 living with them, 34.9% were married couples living together, 30.0% had a female householder with no husband present, and 30.8% were non-families. 28.0% of all households were made up of individuals, and 12.7% had someone living alone who was 65 years of age or older. The average household size was 2.54 and the average family size was 3.11.

29.2% of the population were under the age of 18, 9.5% from 18 to 24, 24.9% from 25 to 44, 21.5% from 45 to 64, and 14.9% who were 65 years of age or older. The median age was 35 years. For every 100 females, there were 76.7 males. For every 100 females age 18 and over, there were 69.6 males.

The median household income was $24,265 and the median family income for a family was $31,844. Males had a median income of $26,917 compared with $21,667 for females. The per capita income was $16,551. About 23.1% of families and 27.4% of the population were below the poverty line, including 38.8% of those under age 18 and 24.0% of those age 65 or over.

Education

Marion County School District is the governing body of the public schools in the area. The school system supports an alternative school for middle and/or high school students, a vocational career center and an adult learning center.

Pee Dee Academy is a private school.

Marion has a technical center called Academy for Careers and Technology. Nearby higher education institutions include Francis Marion University, Florence–Darlington Technical College, Coker College, and Coastal Carolina University.

Marion has a public library, a branch of the Marion County Library System.

Neighborhoods

 Fox Hollow
  Williams Park
  West Marion
  Rogers Park
  North Main Street
  South Main Street
  Highland
  East Marion

Notable people

Levern Tart, American basketball player
Raymond Felton, professional basketball player for the Oklahoma City Thunder
 Col. Hugh Giles, served with Francis Marion in the SC Militia during the Revolutionary War. Marion was originally named Gilesboro
 M. Warley Platzek (1854–1932), lawyer and New York Supreme Court Justice
Armstrong Williams, the largest minority owner of broadcast TV stations in the United States

Transportation

Airports 
 Myrtle Beach International Airport (MYR), 43 miles southeast from Marion.
 Marion County Airport (MAO)
 Florence Regional Airport (FLO)

Highways

SC 576
SC 41

Industry
 Beneteau – A French sail and motorboat manufacturer
Coca-Cola – A distribution plant 
Marion Industrial Park 
Sunbelt Roofing Service Inc.
Commercial Glass and Metal, an architectural glass design house and factory

References

External links

Cities in South Carolina
Cities in Marion County, South Carolina
County seats in South Carolina